Albany Theatre is a historic theater in Albany, Georgia, United States. It was added to the National Register of Historic Places on August 21, 2006. The Albany Theatre opened on September 12, 1927. The building, no longer in operation as a theatre, is located at 107 North Jackson Street.

The Albany Theatre's first production featured H. L. Tallman on the Robert Morton Organ Company pipe organ (Opus 2304) along with Ralph Barnes and his Albany Theatre Orchestra accompanying The Magic Flame starring Ronald Colman and Vilma Bánky. Homer W. McCallon was the theater's director. The theatre adjusted to films with sound and remained in business until the 1970s.

The theatre was purchased from the Farkas Estate by Oglethorpe Development Group, a minority enterprise which began underwriting a restoration of the theatre as a performing arts center. A 2011 plan was to convert the theater into an apartment building.

The Theatre caught fire in the early morning hours of January 24, 2018. Investigators believe the fire was started when vagrants living in the building threw a lit cigarette onto the roof and caught trash on fire. One person died of soot and smoke inhalation. Three other people, believed to be living in the building, were rescued.

See also
Theatre Albany
National Register of Historic Places listings in Dougherty County, Georgia

References

Theatres completed in 1927
Theatres on the National Register of Historic Places in Georgia (U.S. state)
Buildings and structures in Albany, Georgia
National Register of Historic Places in Dougherty County, Georgia